The Black Rider is a fictional Western character appearing in American comic books published by Marvel Comics. He first appeared in All-Western Winners #2 (Winter 1948), from the company's 1940s forerunner, Timely Comics.

Publication history
After appearing in subsequent issues of the All-Western Winners omnibus, by issue #8 the book changed its title to Black Rider, with the character becoming the lead feature. Other company characters, like Kid Colt and Arrowhead also made appearances. After slightly changing its name again, to Western Tales of Black Rider, by issue #32 the book reverted to an anthology format and was renamed Gunsmoke Western (which took over the numbering of the Black Rider title) through the 1950s.

Most of the Black Rider's adventures were drawn by Syd Shores. When the character's adventures were reprinted in the 1970s in Western Gunfighters, the character was renamed the Black Mask.

A one-shot revival, Strange Westerns Starring the Black Rider appeared in 2006, with a story by Steve Englehart and art by Marshall Rogers.

Fictional character biography
As a young man, Matthew Masters was known as the Cactus Kid, an outlaw.  His criminal career ended one day at the Last Chance Saloon in Jefferson County, Texas, when he faced the David Gang, who had taken the town hostage.  When the dust cleared, the killers were dead, and the Cactus Kid was summoned to the mansion of the governor of Texas. The governor pardoned the young outlaw as a reward for getting rid of the Davis Gang, and the Cactus Kid promised to go to medical school and become a doctor.

Years later, "Doc" Masters became the new physician for the small town of Leadville, Texas.  Masters' new peaceful lifestyle left him unwilling to use violence when a hired killer came to town, and he was branded a coward by the townspeople.  Masters decided to disguise himself as the Black Rider, so that he could fight criminals without revealing his criminal past to the town.

Sometimes later, the Black Rider investigates a crime in Texas that leads him to New York City's Chinatown. There he receives help from a mysterious Chinese man, who is eventually revealed to be a younger version of the Ancient One, future mentor of the occult superhero Doctor Strange.

Other versions
A modern-day version of the character stars in the five-issue ensemble miniseries Six Guns (#1-4 cover-dated Jan.-March 2012), by writer Andy Diggle and artist Davide Gianfelice, and also starring the extant female mercenary Tarantula and new contemporary versions of the Marvel Old West heroes Tex Dawson a.k.a. the Western Kid; Matt Slade; and the Two-Gun Kid.

References

External links
Black Rider at Don Markstein's Toonopedia. Archived from the original on August 27, 2015.
Black Rider at International Heroes

Comics characters introduced in 1948
Marvel Comics superheroes
Marvel Comics male superheroes
Timely Comics characters
1948 comics debuts
1950 comics debuts
1955 comics endings
Marvel Comics Western (genre) characters
Western (genre) comics
Western (genre) gunfighters
Western (genre) heroes and heroines
Western (genre) outlaws